The following outline is provided as an overview of and topical guide to Georgia:

Georgia (country) – country in the Caucasus region of Eurasia, located at the crossroads of Western Asia and Eastern Europe. After a brief period of independence following the Russian Revolution of 1917, Georgia was occupied by Soviet Russia in 1921, becoming the Georgian Soviet Socialist Republic and part of the Soviet Union. After independence in 1991, post-communist Georgia suffered from civil unrest and economic crisis for most of the 1990s. This lasted until the Rose Revolution of 2003, after which the new government introduced democratic and economic reforms.

General reference

 Pronunciation:  
 Common English country name: Georgia
 Official English country name: Georgia
 Common endonym: საქართველო
 Official endonym: საქართველო
 Adjectival: Georgian
 Demonym(s):
 Etymology: Name of Georgia (country)
 ISO country codes: GE, GEO, 268
 ISO region codes: See ISO 3166-2:GE
 Internet country code top-level domain: .ge

Geography of Georgia 

 Georgia is: a country
 Location:
 Eurasia
 Caucasus (between Europe and Asia)
 South Caucasus
 Time zone:  UTC+04
 Extreme points of Georgia
 High:  Shkhara 
 Low:  Black Sea 0 m
 Land boundaries:  1,461 km
 723 km
 322 km
 252 km
 164 km
 Coastline:  Black Sea 310 km
 Population of Georgia (country): 

 Area of Georgia (country): 69,700 km2
 Atlas of Georgia

Environment of Georgia 

 Climate of Georgia
 Renewable energy in Georgia
 Geology of Georgia
 Protected areas of Georgia
 Biosphere reserves in Georgia
 National parks of Georgia
 Wildlife of Georgia
 Fauna of Georgia
 Birds of Georgia
 Mammals of Georgia

Natural geographic features of Georgia 

 Glaciers of Georgia
 Lakes of Georgia
 Mountains of Georgia
 Volcanoes in Georgia
 Rivers of Georgia
 Waterfalls of Georgia
 Valleys of Georgia
 World Heritage Sites in Georgia

Regions of Georgia 

Regions of Georgia

Ecoregions of Georgia 

List of ecoregions in Georgia

Administrative divisions of Georgia 

 Occupied territories of Georgia

Municipalities of Georgia 

 Capital of Georgia: Tbilisi
 Cities of Georgia

Demography of Georgia

Government and politics of Georgia 

 Form of government: semi-presidential representative democratic republic
 Capital of Georgia: Tbilisi
 Elections in Georgia
 Political parties in Georgia

Branches of the government of Georgia

Executive branch of the government of Georgia 
 Head of state: President of Georgia,
 Head of government: Prime Minister of Georgia,
 Cabinet of Georgia

Legislative branch of the government of Georgia 

 Parliament of Georgia (unicameral)

Judicial branch of the government of Georgia 

Court system of Georgia
 Supreme Court of Georgia

Foreign relations of Georgia 

Foreign relations of Georgia
 Diplomatic missions in Georgia
 Diplomatic missions of Georgia

International organization membership 
Georgia is a member of:

Asian Development Bank (ADB)
Black Sea Economic Cooperation Zone (BSEC)
Council of Europe (CE)
Euro-Atlantic Partnership Council (EAPC)
European Bank for Reconstruction and Development (EBRD)
Food and Agriculture Organization (FAO)
General Confederation of Trade Unions (GCTU)
International Atomic Energy Agency (IAEA)
International Bank for Reconstruction and Development (IBRD)
International Chamber of Commerce (ICC)
International Civil Aviation Organization (ICAO)
International Criminal Court (ICCt)
International Criminal Police Organization (Interpol)
International Development Association (IDA)
International Federation of Red Cross and Red Crescent Societies (IFRCS)
International Finance Corporation (IFC)
International Fund for Agricultural Development (IFAD)
International Labour Organization (ILO)
International Maritime Organization (IMO)
International Monetary Fund (IMF)
International Olympic Committee (IOC)
International Organization for Migration (IOM)
International Organization for Standardization (ISO) (correspondent)
International Red Cross and Red Crescent Movement (ICRM)

International Telecommunication Union (ITU)
International Telecommunications Satellite Organization (ITSO)
International Trade Union Confederation (ITUC)
Inter-Parliamentary Union (IPU)
Multilateral Investment Guarantee Agency (MIGA)
Organisation internationale de la Francophonie (OIF) (observer)
Organization for Democracy and Economic Development (GUAM)
Organization for Security and Cooperation in Europe (OSCE)
Organisation for the Prohibition of Chemical Weapons (OPCW)
Organization of American States (OAS) (observer)
Partnership for Peace (PFP)
Southeast European Cooperative Initiative (SECI) (observer)
United Nations (UN)
United Nations Conference on Trade and Development (UNCTAD)
United Nations Educational, Scientific, and Cultural Organization (UNESCO)
United Nations Industrial Development Organization (UNIDO)
Universal Postal Union (UPU)
World Customs Organization (WCO)
World Federation of Trade Unions (WFTU)
World Health Organization (WHO)
World Intellectual Property Organization (WIPO)
World Meteorological Organization (WMO)
World Tourism Organization (UNWTO)
World Trade Organization (WTO)

Law and order in Georgia 

Law of Georgia (country)
 Capital punishment in Georgia
 Constitution of Georgia
 Human rights in Georgia
 LGBT rights in Georgia
 Freedom of religion in Georgia
 Law enforcement in Georgia

Military of Georgia 

Defense Forces of Georgia
 Command
 Commander-in-chief:
 Ministry of Defense of Georgia
 Forces
 Georgian Land Forces
 Coast Guard of Georgia
 Georgian Air Force
 Special forces of Georgia
 Military history of Georgia
 Military ranks of Georgia

Local government in Georgia

History of Georgia 

 Military history of Georgia

Culture of Georgia 

 Architecture of Georgia
 Cuisine of Georgia
 Ethnic minorities in Georgia
 Festivals in Georgia
 Languages of Georgia
 Media in Georgia
 National symbols of Georgia
 Coat of arms of Georgia
 Flag of Georgia
 National anthem of Georgia
 People of Georgia
 Public holidays in Georgia
 Records of Georgia
 Religion in Georgia
 Christianity in Georgia
 Hinduism in Georgia
 Islam in Georgia
 Judaism in Georgia
 Sikhism in Georgia
 World Heritage Sites in Georgia

Art in Georgia 
 Art in Georgia
 Cinema of Georgia
 Literature of Georgia
 Music of Georgia
 Television in Georgia
 Theatre in Georgia

Sports in Georgia 

 Football in Georgia
 Georgia at the Olympics

Economy and infrastructure of Georgia 

 Economic rank, by nominal GDP (2007): 116th (one hundred and sixteenth)
 Agriculture in Georgia
 Banking in Georgia
 National Bank of Georgia
 Telecommunications in Georgia
 Companies of Georgia
Currency of Georgia: Lari
ISO 4217: GEL
 Energy in Georgia (country)
 Energy policy of Georgia
 Oil industry in Georgia
 Healthcare in Georgia
 Mining in Georgia
 Georgia Stock Exchange
 Tourism in Georgia
 Transport in Georgia
 Airports in Georgia
 Rail transport in Georgia
 Roads in Georgia

Education in Georgia

See also 

Index of Georgia (country)-related articles
List of Georgia (country)-related topics
List of international rankings
Member state of the United Nations
Outline of Abkhazia
Outline of Asia
Outline of geography
Outline of South Ossetia

References

External links

 Government
 President of Georgia
 Government of Georgia
 Ministry of Foreign Affairs of Georgia 
 Department of Tourism and Resorts

 News and data
 Georgia. The World Factbook. Central Intelligence Agency.
 
 Full information about (country) Georgia (In English, German, Russian and Georgian)
 Georgia TVNews
 Topographic Engineering Center Maps and Earth Sciences Information on Georgia

Georgia
 
Georgia (country)